The Atlas 100 (formerly the Allen Crowe 100) is an ARCA Racing Series stock car race held annually on the Illinois State Fairgrounds Racetrack during the Illinois State Fair.

Allen Crowe
Born November 12, 1928, in Springfield, Illinois, Allen Crowe died in New Bremen, Ohio, on June 2, 1963, from injuries sustained in a Sprint Car race at New Bremen Speedway.
Allen cut his teeth at the now-defunct Springfield Speedway. He started in Stock cars and moved up fast. He soon became a first class racer, winning the Missouri-Illinois stock car title. He began racing in the USAC Championship Car Series, racing in the 1961 through 1963 seasons with 15 starts, including the 1962 and 1963 Indianapolis 500 races. He finished in the top ten six times, with his best finish of 5th in 1962 at Syracuse.

Race history
The first race was held August 25, 1963. That race was won by NASCAR driver Curtis Turner.

USAC era
USAC's Stock Car division sanctioned the race from the race's inception in 1963, until the series' demise in 1984.
1972's race was an odd occurrence, in that Al Unser won the USAC Stock car race on Saturday, and then won the USAC Championship Dirt Car race the following day. The feat has never been repeated in the years since.

Co-sanctioning
As USAC was downsizing its Stock car division, the 1983 and 1984 running of the Allen Crowe Memorial was co-sanctioned with ARCA.

ARCA era
ARCA took over as sole sanctioning body in 1985, with the race name having different variations during years when there was no sponsor title, such as "Allen Crowe Memorial", "Allen Crowe Memorial 100", "Allen Crowe Memorial ARCA 100", or simply "Allen Crowe 100". Beginning in 1989, the race was renamed the Coors Allen Crowe Memorial 100. In 1995, it took the name "Pabst Genuine Draft 100", then was known as the "Super Chevy Dealers 100" for 1996, before returning to the original name for 1997. From 1999 to 2001, the race was known as the "Par-A-Dice 100", due to a new sponsor agreement. The race reverted to the "Allen Crowe Memorial 100" (or a variation of) moniker in 2002 and kept it until being renamed the "SuperChevyStores.com 100" for 2014.

Race winners

 1963 – 1982: USAC-sanctioned event
 1983 – 1984: ARCA and USAC co-sanctioned event
 1985 – present: ARCA-sanctioned event
† – Record for a 100-mile race.
§ - Because of inclement weather and track preparation, the race was run to a time limit as to allow other events at the Fairgrounds to start on time.  Race start delayed to 1448 local time, and distance changed to one lap after 1559.  Race further shortened by a red flag during the final lap caused by a crash.  Race was red-flagged on Lap 76, but countback rule meant ARCA declared results official as of Lap 74.

References:

Tragedy
There have been no deaths in the race attributed to crashes; however, four-time Allen Crowe Memorial 100 winner Dean Roper, whose son Tony Roper was killed in a NASCAR Craftsman Truck Series race 10 months earlier, suffered a heart attack on lap 17 of the 2001 race.  Roper's car slowed on the frontstretch, then hit the inside retaining wall. He was unconscious when medical help arrived and later pronounced dead at Springfield Memorial Hospital.

References

External links
 

ARCA Menards Series races
ARCA Menards Series
Motorsport in Illinois
Recurring sporting events established in 1963
1963 establishments in Illinois
Illinois State Fair
Annual sporting events in the United States